Alejandra Robles Gil Pérez (born February 7, 1990) is a Mexican actress.

Biography
Alejandra Robles Gil was born in Mexico City and graduated from the Centro de Educación Artística (CEA). She began her television career in 2012 with the hit telenovela Porque el amor manda, where she played Alejandra, sharing credits with Blanca Soto and Fernando Colunga.

That same year she played Liz in the telenovela Wild at Heart, along with Ana Brenda Contreras and Daniel Arenas. In 2014, she played the evil Inés in The Stray Cat, alongside Maite Perroni and again with Daniel Arenas.

In 2015, Robles Gil played Teodora in the telenovela Que te perdone Dios, with Zuria Vega and Mark Tacher. That same year, she participated in the series Como dice el dicho, in the chapter "Quien pobre anocheció".

In 2016 she played Lucía Arenti in the telenovela Simplemente María, with Claudia Álvarez, José Ron, and Eleazar Gómez.

In August 2017, Alejandra Robles Gil and her partner Alejandro Domínguez announced that they were having a baby named Thiago.

Filmography

Film roles

Television roles

Awards and recognition

References

External links
 
 
 

1990 births
21st-century Mexican actresses
Actresses from Mexico City
Living people
Mexican telenovela actresses